In and Out of the Kitchen is a British comedy television series first broadcast on BBC Four in 2015. The three-part series, written by Miles Jupp, was based on In and Out of the Kitchen on BBC Radio 4. The production company behind the series is BBC Comedy.

A pilot episode, directed by Mandie Fletcher, was created for BBC Two in 2013.

The series was cancelled after three episodes

Cast
Miles Jupp as Damien Trench, a cookery writer
Justin Edwards as Anthony

Episodes

References

External links
 
 
 

2010s British comedy television series
2015 British television series debuts
2015 British television series endings
BBC television comedy
English-language television shows
Television shows set in the United Kingdom